The Fondation Carmignac, based in Paris, France, awards the annual Carmignac Gestion Photojournalism Award. It was founded in 2000 by Édouard Carmignac and maintains an art collection that is open to the public on Porquerolles Island in Var, France.

History 
Financier Édouard Carmignac established the corporate collection Fondation Carmignac in 2000. The collection is on display at Carmignac Gestion's headquarters in Paris, and at its offices in London, Madrid, Milan, Frankfurt, Luxembourg and Zurich.  

Carmignac first visited Porquerolles island in the 1980s and acquired the property with its 15 hectares of land. Architects GM Architectes Associés, unable to build on protected land, burrowed into it to create  of subterranean exhibition space. Initially planned to open in 2014, the space opened in 2018. 

The opening exhibition in 2018 focused on Carmignac’s own 300-strong collection of Pop and postmodern artworks.

Collection 
Originally centred on Pop Art and the German Expressionist School, the Carmignac corporate collection includes over 250 works from the 20th and 21st centuries, including artwork by Andy Warhol, Jean-Michel Basquiat, Roy Lichtenstein, Gerhard Richter, Andreas Gursky, Keith Haring, Martial Raysse, Zhang Huan, Korakrit Ayunanondchaï, Richard Prince and Sterling Ruby.

Commissioned works for Porquerolles include Ugo Rondinone’s Four Seasons (2018), a ring of gurning silver heads, and Olaf Breuning’s Mother Nature (2018), a big red tufty-haired face.

The Carmignac Photojournalism Award 
Created in 2009, and directed by Emeric Glayse, the annual Carmignac Photojournalism Award supports the production of an investigative photographic report on a region of the world where fundamental rights are threatened. Endowed with a €50,000 research grant, the laureate carries out their reportage with the support of the Foundation which organizes, upon their return, a travelling exhibition and the publication of a monograph. The foundation annually acquires four photographs from the winner’s portfolio.

In 2016, the Photojournalism Award retrospective 2009–2015 at Saatchi Gallery was the most visited photojournalism exhibition.

In 2016, the 7th laureate, the photojournalist Narciso Contreras, brought back the first proofs of slavery in Libya.
 
Past winners:
 2009 : , Gaza : The Book of Destruction
 2010 : Massimo Berruti, Pashtunistan : Lashkars
 2011 : Robin Hammond, Zimbabwe : Your wounds will be named silence
 2012 : Davide Monteleone, Chechnya : Spasibo
 2013 : Newsha Tavakolian, Iran : Blank Pages of an Iranian Photo Album
 2014 : Christophe Gin, French Guiana : Colony
 2015 : Narciso Contreras, Libya: A Human Marketplace
 2016 : , The trap - Trafficking of women in Nepal
 2017 : Yuri Kozyrev & Kadir van Lohuizen, Arctic: New Frontier (chaired by climatologist Jean Jouzel, co-laureate of the 2007 Nobel Peace Prize)
 2018 : Tommaso Protti, Amazônia (chaired by Yolanda Kakabadse, former president of WWF)
 2019 : The 11th edition is dedicated to the Democratic Republic of the Congo.

The Porquerolles project 

The Foundation has plans to open new premises in 2016 on the island of Porquerolles (Var, France), in the heart of the Port-Cros National Park.
The site will be open to the public and will show temporary exhibitions and artworks which will be created in situ for the museum and sculpture park.

The change of use for the existing building, a Provençal country house that is typical of the local architecture, requires a re-design which will be conducted by architect GMAA. The Carmignac Foundation commissioned landscape architect Louis Benech for the design of the gardens.

References

2000 establishments in France
Companies based in Paris
Photography awards
Awards established in 2009
Carmignac